Chemical and Allied Export Promotion Council (CAPEXIL), a non-profit making organization, was setup in March 1958 by the Ministry of Commerce, Government of India to promote export of Chemical and Allied Products from India. With the headquarter at Kolkata, and regional offices at New Delhi, Mumbai, Kolkata and Chennai, CAPEXIL has more than 3500 members across the country.

References

Ministry of Commerce and Industry (India)